Sempervivum macedonicum is a perennial plant of the genus Sempervivum.

macedonicum
Plants described in 1930